ASMedia Technology Inc. is a Taiwanese integrated circuit design company owned by Asus. It produces designs for USB, PCI Express and SATA controllers. Excluding the X570 chipset, all of the AM4 chipsets for AMD's Zen micro-architecture were designed by ASMedia.

References

Asus
Electronics companies established in 2004
Fabless semiconductor companies
Taiwanese companies established in 2004
Semiconductor companies of Taiwan